Drew McAlister is an Australian country musician. McAlister was one half of the duo McAlister Kemp. His solo album Black Sky debuted at #99 on the ARIA album charts.

Career
McAlister won the 2003 Maton Talent Search at the annual Gympie Muster. 
In 2007, he won Vocal Collaboration of the Year  for "A Little Bit Of Countryin Us All" with Allan Caswell. He has since won golden guitars for Song of the Year and Heritage Song of the Year. He released his debut solo album, There to Here, in 2008. In 2009 he joined together with Troy Kemp to form McAlister Kemp, releasing three studio albums together. The pair received an ARIA-nomination for their 2012 album, Country Proud.  After the duo broke up he released his second solo album Black Sky.  

His third solo album, Coming Your Way was released in September 2017. It was nominated for Contemporary Country Album of the Year at the CMA awards of 2018.

His fourth studio album, an acoustic and stripped back album titled, Fabric of Life was released on 2 December 2022

Discography

Albums

See also
 McAlister Kemp

Awards and nominations

Country Music Awards of Australia
The Country Music Awards of Australia (CMAA) (also known as the Golden Guitar Awards) is an annual awards night held in January during the Tamworth Country Music Festival, celebrating recording excellence in the Australian country music industry. They have been held annually since 1973.
 (wins only)
|-
| 2007
| "A Little Bit of Country in Us All" by Allan Caswell & Drew McAlister 
| Vocal Collaboration of the Year
| 
|-
|rowspan="2"| 2014
|rowspan="2"| "Lady of the Land" (written by Luke O'Shea & Drew McAlister) recorded by Luke O'Shea 
| Heritage Song of the Year
| 
|-
| APRA AMCOS Song of the Year
|

References

External links

Australian country singers
Australian male singers
Living people
Year of birth missing (living people)